Varvara Michajlovna Arsen'eva (Russian: Варва́ра Миха́йловна Арсе́ньева; 1676-1730), was a Russian courtier and mistress of Peter the Great.

She was the daughter of the governor Bulgakov Arsenyev and sister-in-law of Alexander Danilovich Menshikov. She was appointed lady in waiting to the Empress Catherine, and was for a time the lover of Peter the Great. In 1727, she was appointed Ober-Hofmeisterin. The same year, however, she was exiled to a convent after the fall of Menshikov.

References 
 Н. И. Павленко. Крушение. Ссылка // Александр Данилович Меншиков. — М: «Наука», 1981. — С. 160. — 140 000 экз.

1676 births
1730 deaths
18th-century people from the Russian Empire
Mistresses of Peter the Great
Tsardom of Russia ladies-in-waiting